Bhanu Prakash Mirdha (born 27 March 1953) is an Indian politician and a member of the Bharatiya Janata Party. He is a former member of Lok Sabha. In 1997, he was elected to the 11th Lok Sabha Bye election from Nagaur constituency in Rajasthan state defeating Ram Niwas Mirdha.

Born in 1953 he was educated at Delhi University. He is agriculturist by profession. He is son of Nathuram Mirdha.

He is married to Smt. Indira Mirdha and has two sons.

External links 

Rajasthani politicians
Living people
India MPs 1996–1997
1953 births
People from Nagaur
Lok Sabha members from Rajasthan
Bhanu Prakash
Bharatiya Janata Party politicians from Rajasthan